Whitehouse Beach adjoins an area of former salt marsh in Westmoreland, Jamaica. The area is being developed as a tourist resort.

About  of the beach is maintained by the new Sandals Whitehouse resort.

Bathing
Protected by a coral reef, gently shelving waters are almost as still as a mill pond with a few ripples. Two swimming areas 230m and 160m long monitored by lifeguards are marked by buoys. Swimming outside these areas, although formally discouraged, appears to be tolerated, and is attractive to those wishing to swim longer distances.

Tourism
Strangely, the tourists mainly pack themselves around the several pools in the resort, leaving the many beach loungers, umbrellas and the beach itself an oasis of quiet isolation close to all the resort's facilities.

Access is strictly controlled and a day pass costs US$85. For this one gets full access to all the resort facilities including meals drinks and water sports. However, only the most energetic could hope to take full advantage of all that is on offer in a single day. Those looking just for a place to swim and lounge will doubtless try one of the cheaper or free options elsewhere.

Ecological damage

The coral reef about 400m from the beach is used for snorkelling. Unfortunately, the coral has been badly damaged by fishermen using dynamite. It will take a long time to recover its former splendour.

The trees were badly damaged by Hurricane Ivan in 2004, and the dead tree trunks and stumps still bear witness to the storm's power. 

The salt marshes are subject to environmental protection orders. Many birds are regularly seen along the beach, and a notice alerts one to crocodiles.

See also
 List of beaches in Jamaica

External links
Aerial view.
Photos:

References

Beaches of Jamaica
Geography of Westmoreland Parish
Tourist attractions in Westmoreland Parish
Resorts in Jamaica